Kasumbalesa, Zambia is a town in Zambia, that sits across the international border from the much larger town of Kasumbalesa, Democratic Republic of the Congo. It is a major crossing point for human traffic and cargo, between the two countries.

Location
The geographical coordinates of Kasumbalesa, Zambia are 12°16'05.0"S, 27°47'40.0"E (Latitude:-12.268056; Longtude:27.794444).

Overview
Kasumbalesa is a busy road-crossing point between Zambia and the Democratic Republic of the Congo, clearing in excess of 500 long-haul trucks daily in each direction. The infrastructure on the Zambian side of the border has been lacking, as of May 2019. Of particular concern, is the lack of public toilet facilities, posing a health risk.

Plans are underway to improve infrastructure including the construction of a larger parking yard for long-distance trucks, the construction of hotels and restaurants and the provision of public toilets, through public-private-partnership arrangements.

Finance Bank Zambia Limited (soon to be Equity Bank Zambia Limited) maintains a branch in the town.

See also
 Southern African Development Community

References

External links
Copperbelt Minister Lusambo and Katanga Governor resolve Kasumbalesa stand-off, trucks begin crossing As at 6 January 2017.

Populated places in Zambia
Democratic Republic of the Congo–Zambia border crossings
Chililabombwe District
Copperbelt Province